Chad Gaylord Smith (born October 25, 1961) is an American musician who has been the drummer of the rock band Red Hot Chili Peppers since 1988. The group was inducted into the Rock and Roll Hall of Fame in 2012. Smith is also the drummer of the hard rock supergroup Chickenfoot, formed in 2008, and of the all-instrumental outfit Chad Smith's Bombastic Meatbats, formed in 2007. He worked with the Chicks on Taking the Long Way, an album that won five Grammy Awards in 2007.

Smith has recorded with Glenn Hughes, Johnny Cash, John Fogerty, Geezer Butler, Jennifer Nettles, Kid Rock, Jake Bugg, the Avett Brothers, Joe Satriani, Post Malone, Eddie Vedder, Lana Del Rey and Halsey. In 2010, joined by Dick Van Dyke and Leslie Bixler, he released Rhythm Train, a children's album which featured Smith singing and playing various instruments. In 2020, Smith co-wrote and performed as part of the backing band on Ozzy Osbourne's album, Ordinary Man, and again in 2022 on Patient Number 9.

Spin magazine placed Smith at #10 on their list of the "100 Greatest Drummers of Alternative Music" in May 2013. Readers of UK-based Rhythm magazine ranked Smith and Red Hot Chili Pepper bassist Flea the fourth-greatest rhythm section of all time in their June 2013 issue. Smith is also known for his charity work especially with young musicians. He has been a lobbyist in support of music education in U.S. public schools. Smith is also the host of the PBS concert series Landmarks Live in Concert, which began in January 2017.

Early life
Smith was born in St. Paul, Minnesota, the third child of Joan and Curtis Smith. He spent most of his childhood in Bloomfield Hills, Michigan, where he graduated from Lahser High School in 1980. He started to play drums at age seven and grew up listening mainly to bands such as Rush, the Rolling Stones, Humble Pie, Pink Floyd, Black Sabbath, Led Zeppelin, Deep Purple, the Who, the Jimi Hendrix Experience, and Kiss.

Chad did not receive formal drum lessons, and gained drumming experience by playing in school bands. He ran away from home when he was 15, but returned home after a summer.

Smith spent his early years in various rock bands, starting in high school with a band called Paradise, where they won the battle of the bands in Birmingham, Michigan, in 1977. That first band included members, Jay Yang (bass), Scott Porter (lead guitar) and Tom Auch (roadie).  Future bands included Pharroh and Michigan-based band Toby Redd. Pharroh's percussionist Larry Fratangelo, who also worked with Parliament-Funkadelic, introduced Smith to R&B and funk music and taught him how to play funk. Smith said, "I think up until then, I was a drummer. Once I studied with Larry, I turned into a musician." Funk drummers like David Garibaldi, Jabo Starks, Clyde Stubblefield, and Greg Errico caught his attention and influenced his style a lot. Later, Smith decided to move to California to pursue his musical aspirations.

Music career

Red Hot Chili Peppers (1988–present)
In 1988, the Red Hot Chili Peppers were looking for a replacement for their drummer D.H. Peligro, who had recently been fired. Already into the process of working on their fourth studio album and hiring new guitarist John Frusciante the band held open auditions for a new drummer. Smith was one of the last drummers to audition for the band and the band felt that on looks alone, Smith would be the wrong fit as he looked more hair-metal than punk. Nonetheless, the band was blown away by his audition. Singer Anthony Kiedis admired Smith and found his persistence impressive. 

Smith joined the Chili Peppers in December 1988 and within a few months was recording his first album with the band, Mother's Milk. Smith reflected on joining the band in a 2012 interview by saying “I remember thinking, ‘Oh, cool, they have a record deal. Great! I'd love to be in a band that has a record deal. We started playing, and right away we just hit it off musically. I was like, ‘Man, this is a blast! These guys are great!’ ... We were just doing what we do. We just jammed, which is what we still do today. It's very similar.”

After a successful worldwide tour in support of Mother's Milk the band released their debut for Warners, 1991's Blood Sugar Sex Magik which was hugely successful upon its release peaking at number three on the Billboard charts, and went on to sell 13 million copies worldwide. It went on to be nominated and win several awards and is listed on many critics lists of the best albums of the year. Shortly into the tour for the album, Frusciante quit the band in 1992 and was replaced by Arik Marshall for the remainder of the tour. Marshall was fired following the tour and briefly replaced by Jesse Tobias who was let go in favor of Dave Navarro in 1994. With Navarro, the band would release 1995's One Hot Minute. Navarro too would end up being fired in 1998 following the tour to support the album and replaced with a returning John Frusciante. With Frusciante back, the band released 1999's Californication, their biggest selling album to date. That album was followed by 2002's By the Way and 2006's Stadium Arcadium, the band's first number one album in the United States. Frusciante again quit the band in 2009 and was replaced by Josh Klinghoffer later that year. With Klinghoffer, the band released their tenth studio album (and Smith's seventh with the band), I'm with You in 2011.

In April 2012, the Chili Peppers were inducted by Chris Rock into the Rock and Roll Hall of Fame. Smith and the Chili Peppers wrapped up I'm With You World Tour in April 2013. The Chili Peppers launched another lengthy tour in May 2013 and it kept them on the road until June 2014. During this time, the band appeared alongside Bruno Mars at the halftime for the Super Bowl in February 2014. Smith confirmed that the Chili Peppers would begin work on their eleventh studio album that same month. Production eventually began in January 2015 with Danger Mouse replacing Rick Rubin as the band's producer. A month later, bassist Flea was injured during a skiing accident delaying production until August 2015. The Getaway  was released on June 17, 2016. 

In December 2019, the band announced that John Frusciante would be returning to replace Josh Klinghoffer. Smith said that the band would be focused on making new music and hope to have a new album out in 2020, however due to the COVID-19 pandemic, recording of the album was delayed. On May 25, 2021, Smith said that the band is currently near completion on their twelfth studio album and will tour in 2022. On October 7, 2021, the Chili Peppers announced the dates for their 2022 world tour which will begin in June and conclude in September. The tour includes the band's first ever headlining stadium shows in the United States and will be in support of their fourthcoming album, Unlimited Love, which was released on April 1, 2022.

Chad Smith's Bombastic Meatbats (2007–present)
In 2007, Smith, along with fellow Glenn Hughes alumni, guitarist Jeff Kollman and keyboardist Ed Roth, formed an all-instrumental band inspired by their shared love of 1970s funk and fusion. Still unnamed at the time, the group, rounded out by bassist Kevin Chown, debuted at the 2008 NAMM show in Anaheim, California. The band has released two studio albums and a double live disc as Chad Smith's Bombastic Meatbats since its inception.

Chickenfoot (2008–present)
Following a lengthy world tour in support of Stadium Arcadium, the Chili Peppers decided to take a break in 2008. During this break, Smith joined the hard rock supergroup Chickenfoot, whose other members are Sammy Hagar, Joe Satriani and Michael Anthony. The group has released two studio albums, a live album and a box set to date with Smith. Due to touring commitments with the Chili Peppers in 2011, Smith was unable to tour with Chickenfoot and was replaced by Kenny Aronoff. In 2012, Smith rejoined Chickenfoot for a four-song encore and the band briefly reunited for only two shows on May 7, and May 8, 2016, at Harrah's Showroom at South Lake Tahoe. 

During the show, the band debuted a new song titled "Divine Termination." In June 2016, Smith discussed the future of Chickenfoot touring and recording new music saying that "everyone has different things going on. We really enjoy playing together, but with my schedule I don't see us playing too much. I would love to make some new music with those guys, but we'd have to be in the same room at the same time. I just don't know. It's up in the air. I love playing with those guys, though. It's a real treat.

Other projects

Smith released 2010's Rhythm Train, a critically acclaimed children's album which he recorded with Dick Van Dyke and Leslie Bixler. 

Smith released an app in March 2012, which is free mobile application for iPhone, iPad and Android devices and features his "Drummer GPS". The GPS section of the app spotlights drummers Smith has been influenced by and those he regards as some of the best modern drummers. In May 2013, he launched In Conversation with Chad Smith, his own podcast through MusicRadar where he interviews other musical artists.

Smith joined Sammy Hagar in the studio to work on music for his twelfth studio album. They were joined by guitarist Neal Schon from (Journey (band)) and bassist Michael Anthony and according to Hagar it was the rebirth of his 1980s band HSAS, which featured Schon and two other members. 

In 2013, Smith joined jazz musician Jon Batiste and bassist/producer Bill Laswell to create a unique musical group to score a film that had yet to be written and will never be made. The album, The Process, was released on November 4, 2014.

Starting on January 20, 2017, Smith began hosting Landmarks Live in Concert, an eight-episode concert series on PBS in which Smith will sit down and discuss music with various artists. The first two episodes featured Alicia Keys and Brad Paisley.

Smith performs drums on the Lorne Balfe composed score for The Lego Batman Movie. The soundtrack for the animated film was released on February 3, 2017.

On May 28, 2018, Smith along with co-host and Yahoo Entertainment music editor Lyndsey Parker, began their own music radio talk show on SiriusXM titled VOLUME West which airs every Monday. The duo will talk music with artists, industry leaders,  friends and they will also interview their guests about their favorite songs, albums, and artists.

Smith performs drums on the Post Malone song "Take What You Want" from his third album Hollywood's Bleeding. The song also features Black Sabbath lead singer Ozzy Osbourne and rapper Travis Scott. That collaboration with Post Malone led to the creation of Osbourne's 2020 album, Ordinary Man, which Smith co-wrote along with Guns N' Roses bassist Duff McKagan and producer Andrew Watt. Smith also performed drums on every track. On December 17, 2020, it was announced that the next studio album by Ozzy Osbourne was halfway done and would again feature Smith along with Metallica bassist Robert Trujillo and drummer Taylor Hawkins from Foo Fighters.

On January 1, 2021, Post Malone during his Bud Light Seltzer Sessions New Year's Eve 2021 livestream show was joined by Smith, Slash from Guns N' Roses, Chris Chaney from Jane’s Addiction and producer/guitarist Andrew Watt for a performance of Black Sabbath's "War Pigs" and "Rooster" by Alice In Chains. Smith contributed to the charity tribute album The Metallica Blacklist, released in September 2021, backing Miley Cyrus on her cover of the Metallica song "Nothing Else Matters".

Smith performs drums on Ozzy Osbourne's 2022 album, Patient Number 9. Smith also co-wrote two of the songs on the album.

Smith and Flea, Josh Klinghoffer collaborated with Morrissey on his upcoming album Bonfire of Teenagers, which was supposed to be released in February 2023, but in December 2022 it was announced that its future is in limbo, as Capitol Records decided not to release it.

Smith performs on seven of the songs and also co-wrote five songs on Iggy Pop's 2022 album, Every Loser. To promote the album, Smith will be part of Pop's backing band called The Losers which consists of Josh Klinghoffer, Duff McKagan and Andrew Watt.

Playing style
Smith's technique is recognized for its use of ghost notes, and his fast right foot.

He cites Buddy Rich, John Bonham, Ian Paice, Mitch Mitchell, Bill Ward, Keith Moon, Stewart Copeland, Neil Peart, Ginger Baker, Roger Taylor and Topper Headon as influences on his drumming.

Charity work
Smith is an active supporter of a number of non-profit organizations including Surfer's Healing, SeriousFun Network, MusiCares, Silverlake Conservatory of Music, Guitar Mash NY, Camp Korey and Little Kids Rock which he discussed in an interview with Making Music Magazine.

In April 2013, Smith was asked by NAMM, the National Association of Music Merchants, to represent the music community by going to Washington, D.C. as a lobbyist in support of music education in US public schools. While in DC, Smith had the opportunity to meet with congressional leaders and share his experience as a student who learned his craft entirely within the public school system. Smith has since been invited back to lobby in April 2014 in support of public school music education.

In 2014, Smith joined Bystander Revolution a group that speaks out against bullying in schools and tries to find solutions. Smith released a few videos discussing his own childhood being bullied along with his son's recent experiences with bullies.

On May 21, 2014, Smith appeared along with other celebrities in Washington, D.C. at a White House talent show held by Michelle Obama which was organized to raise awareness for Turnaround Arts, a program enacted under the guidance of the President's Committee on the Arts and Humanities (PCAH) to increase performance and achievement at some of the lowest-ranked schools in the country through arts education. Students from eight schools around the country participated in the show which featured musical theatre, spoken word and interpretative dance. President Barack Obama made a surprise appearance at the event. Smith adopted a school in Greenfield, California also lobbied Speaker of the House of Representatives John Boehner for increased funding for arts education and that it is a personal issue for him. Smith said "I didn't give a shit about science, math or English when I was in school and music was the only reason I wanted to go. It got me interested in other subjects and I would've never graduated without it. If kids can connect with some sort of art in some way, it will enrich their lives in ways they probably can't fully comprehend at the time." Earlier in the week, Smith was joined by former New York Yankee and musician, Bernie Williams at Savoy Elementary School in Washington, D.C. where together they taught a music class. "These are schools where the kids look down at their feet and have no hope and don't feel like they mean anything. They have no self-worth. They need something. This is not a photo-op and just throwing some money. You really roll your sleeves up and immerse yourself in the school." Smith said.

Smith appeared at Sammy Hagar and James Hetfield's 2nd annual Acoustic-4-A-Cure benefit concert in San Francisco, California on May 15, 2015. The benefit was held to raise money and awareness for the Pediatric Cancer Program at UCSF Benioff Children’s Hospital. Smith was joined onstage by Pat Monahan of the band Train and comedian Adam Sandler for a performance of Aerosmith's "Dream On" and Led Zeppelin's "Ramble On".

The following day on May 16, 2015, Smith was honored by national nonprofit, Little Kids Rock at its annual Family Jam benefit at Facebook's Menlo Park campus for his work to help expand public schoolchildren's access to music education with the "Livin' The Dream Award". In a statement on receiving the award Smith said "It is such an honor for me to be recognized by an amazing charity like Little Kids Rock for supporting their work to keep music education thriving in our schools. Music has made such a tremendous impact in my life and I am blessed to be able to give that gift back to the next generation of music makers!"

Smith along with his Chili Peppers bandmates announced in September 2015 that they would be supporting Bernie Sanders in his campaign for the 2016 presidential election. In February 2016, the Chili Peppers performed on behalf of Sanders at his "Feel the Bern" campaign fundraiser.

On April 29, 2016, Chad Smith and Will Ferrell hosted the Red Hot Benefit Comedy + Music Show & Quinceanera. The benefit featured a performance by the Chili Peppers along with comedy acts selected by Ferrell and Funny or Die. A portion of the proceeds went to Ferrell's Cancer for College and Smith's Silverlake Conservatory of Music.

On February 12, 2018, Smith again teamed with Will Ferrell for his One Classy Night event at the Moore Theater in Seattle to help raise money for Cancer for College. Smith along with Ferrell, Mike McCready and Brandi Carlile performed songs by Jimi Hendrix, the Rolling Stones, Led Zeppelin, R.E.M. and were joined by Eddie Vedder for a cover of Depeche Mode's "Personal Jesus". The event raised $300,000 in college scholarship money for students who have survived cancer, and has raised 2.3 million to date.

On October 6, 2018, Smith and Will Ferrell hosted Will Ferrell's Best Night of Your Life, a one night charity event in Los Angeles at the Greek Theater. The event, produced by Funny or Die, will benefit Cancer for College and feature many big-name celebrities. Smith also will assemble an MVP musical line up dubbed Chad Smith's Super Mega Funktastic Jam Rock All Stars which will feature his Chili Peppers bandmate Josh Klinghoffer, Mike McCready of Pearl Jam, Duff McKagan of Guns N’ Roses, Stefan Lessard of Dave Matthews Band, Brad Paisley and Chris Martin of Coldplay.

On January 13, 2019, Smith along with the Chili Peppers performed at a benefit for victims of the recent deadly Woolsey Fire. "It was cool. It was fun. It was a good vibe, and we really appreciate all the people that came down and paid a lot of money — it wasn't a cheap ticket. But all the proceeds are going to the people that suffered from the fires and the families and everything that is involved in that. Smith said that the fires even put the band's recording of their twelfth album on hold saying "the house we were working in, there was no damage, it didn't burn down, but we couldn't get back in there. So that halted our [progress]. Myself and Anthony both live in Point Dume. Seventy houses in our neighborhood burned down. Ours was spared, luckily."

Visual art
In January 2020, Smith opened his first art exhibit, stating "The way that I want to interpret my feelings about playing the drums and playing music - I'm trying to put this in a different medium. [...] I love to express myself in any sort of creative way that I can, and doing this is another way to kind of take chances and take a risk, and I like to do that. I think it's important for any artist to do that- to keep trying new things. It's not your normal medium, you know. It's not like Bob Ross with an afro in front of the thing and painting,” Smith said.

Personal life

Family and relationships 
Smith has been married twice. Smith was married to Maria St John from 1996 to 1997 with whom Smith had a daughter, Manon (born 1997).

He also has two other children, Justin Smith (born 1998) and singer-songwriter Ava Maybee Cardoso Smith (born 2001) through other relationships.

In 2004, Smith married his second wife, architect Nancy Mack, with whom he has three sons, born 2005, 2009 and 2012. The family lives in Malibu, California.

Smith has two elder siblings, brother Bradley and sister Pamela.

Sexual misconduct 

At a beach concert in 1990, Smith and his bandmate Michael "Flea" Balzary picked a 20-year old young woman, groped her, threw her into the sand, tried to take off her bathing suit, and then Balzary yelled at her to perform a sex act. As a result, the men were ordered to apologize, pay a fine, and donate to a rape crisis center.

Sobriety 
Like some of his bandmates in the Red Hot Chili Peppers, Smith has struggled with substance abuse. He struggled with alcoholism and cocaine use for many years. He checked into a drug rehabilitation in 2008.

Sports 
Smith is also an avid fan of his hometown Michigan sports teams, including the NHL's Detroit Red Wings.

Following the Red Hot Chili Peppers May 14, 2017, performance in Columbus, Ohio, Smith sang the University of Michigan fight song "The Victors". Smith's singing of the fight song made national news as the University of Michigan and Ohio State are longtime sports rivals. At shows in Ohio, Smith's drumset has sometimes featured the Michigan Wolverines logo.

Will Ferrell resemblance
Smith is widely known for his strong resemblance to actor and comedian Will Ferrell, who is almost six years younger, which he has acknowledged by wearing shirts reading "I Am Not Will Ferrell" in live performances. Smith said that the two first met during the premiere of the film The Ladies Man (2000). He said, "I'm looking at Will and thinking, 'People really think I look like him? I don't fucking look like that. He looks me up and down and says, 'You're very handsome,' and walks away. Totally deadpan. I was like, 'You're funny. You're funny. Both Smith and Ferrell have utilized the resemblance for various appearances together, including their own events for charity and a 2014 appearance on The Tonight Show Starring Jimmy Fallon, in which the duo faced off in a drum battle, which segued into a musical number by the Red Hot Chili Peppers performing a cover of Blue Öyster Cult's "(Don't Fear) The Reaper", as a reference to the Saturday Night Live "More Cowbell" skit, in which both Ferrell and Fallon starred.

Shark attack incident 
While scuba diving on vacation near Wakaya Island on November 12, 1992, following the Red Hot Chili Peppers' tour of Australia, Smith was attacked by an approximately three-meter hammerhead shark. He was diving offshore when the shark began circling him. Smith attempted to keep still as the shark approached, then fended it off when it attempted to bite him. Afterwards, the shark swam away. The shark removed a "small chunk of skin" from his left arm.

Discography

Red Hot Chili Peppers
 Mother's Milk (1989)
 Blood Sugar Sex Magik (1991)
 What Hits!? (1992)
 Out in L.A. (1994)
 One Hot Minute (1995)
 Private Parts: The Album (1997) (Band, minus Anthony Kiedis, performs with LL Cool J on the song "I Make My Own Rules") (1997)
 Under the Covers: Essential Red Hot Chili Peppers (1998)
 Californication (1999)
 By the Way (2002)
 Greatest Hits (2003)
 Unearthed (Johnny Cash box set. Band, minus Anthony Kiedis, performs on the song "Heart of Gold") (2003) 
 Red Hot Chili Peppers Live in Hyde Park (2004)
 Stadium Arcadium (2006)
 George Clinton and His Gangsters of Love (George Clinton album. Band performs on the song "Let the Good Times Roll") (2008)
 I'm with You (2011)
 2011 Live EP (2012)
 Rock & Roll Hall of Fame Covers EP (2012)
 I'm Beside You (2013)
 2012-13 Live EP (2014)
 Cardiff, Wales: 6/23/04 (2015)
 The Getaway  (2016)
 Live in Paris (2016)
 Unlimited Love (2022)
 Return of the Dream Canteen (2022)

Glenn Hughes
 Songs in the Key of Rock (2003)
 Soulfully Live in the City of Angels (2004)
 Soul Mover (2005)
 Music for the Divine (2006)
 First Underground Nuclear Kitchen (2008)
 Resonate  (2016)

Chickenfoot
 Chickenfoot (2009)
 Chickenfoot III (2011)

Chad Smith's Bombastic Meatbats
 Meet the Meatbats (2009)
 More Meat (2010)
 Live Meat And Potatoes (2012)

Joe Satriani
 What Happens Next (2018) (Smith performs drums on every track)

Josh Klinghoffer
 "Jeepster/Monolith" (2019) (Record Store Day exclusive 7" with Klinghoffer)

Ozzy Osbourne
 Ordinary Man (2020) (Smith performs drums on every track and co-wrote all of the songs)
 Patient Number 9 (2022) (Smith performs drums on every track and co-wrote two songs)

Collaborative albums
 Rhythm Train with Leslie Bixler, Chad Smith and Featuring Dick Van Dyke – (2010)
 The Process, with Jon Batiste and Bill Laswell (2014)
 Earthling – Eddie Vedder (2021-2022) (Smith co-wrote the music in seven songs and performs the drums on nine tracks)

Other appearances

References

External links

Red Hot Chili Peppers official website
Rhythm Train
Chad Smith on Drum Channel
Chad Smith Interview with Sonifly.com
Chad Smith Interview NAMM Oral History Library (2020)

Red Hot Chili Peppers members
Chickenfoot members
1961 births
Living people
Musicians from Saint Paul, Minnesota
People from Richfield, Minnesota
Grammy Award winners
Musicians Institute alumni
American rock drummers
People from Malibu, California
American jazz drummers
American funk drummers
American heavy metal drummers
20th-century American drummers
American male drummers
Jazz musicians from Minnesota
American male jazz musicians
21st-century American drummers
Jazz musicians from California
Chad Smith's Bombastic Meatbats members